HMS Oberon was a Repeat  which served in the Royal Navy during the First World War. The M class were an improvement on the previous , capable of higher speed. The vessel was launched in 1916 and joined the Grand Fleet. Oberon joined the Thirteenth Destroyer Flotilla which, in 1917, participated in a large anti-submarine warfare operation in the North Sea. The sortie led to three German submarines being sunk, although Oberon was not directly involved in these attacks. In 1918, the flotilla was involved in one of the final sorties of the Grand Fleet, but again the destroyer saw no action at the time. After the Armistice that marked the end of the First World War, Oberon was placed in reserve, decommissioned and, in 1921, sold to be broken up.

Design and development
Oberon was one of sixteen Repeat  destroyers ordered by the British Admiralty in February 1915 as part of the Fourth War Construction Programme. The M-class was an improved version of the earlier  destroyers, required to reach a higher speed in order to counter rumoured German fast destroyers. It transpired that the German ships did not exist. The Repeat M class differed from the prewar vessels in having a raked stem and design improvements based on wartime experience.

Armament consisted of three single QF  Mk IV guns on the ship's centreline, with one on the forecastle, one aft on a raised platform and one between the middle and aft funnels. A single 2-pounder  "pom-pom" anti-aircraft gun was carried, while torpedo armament consisted of two twin mounts for  torpedoes. The ship had a complement of 80 officers and ratings.

Construction and career
Laid down at their shipyard in Sunderland, Oberon was launched by William Doxford & Sons on 29 September 1916 and completed during December the same year. The destroyer was the fourth Royal Navy ship to bear the name. On commissioning, Oberon was deployed as part of the Grand Fleet, joining the Thirteenth Destroyer Flotilla based at Rosyth. Between 1 and 10 October 1917, the flotilla took part in a large exercise to detect and trap German submarines in the North Sea. Although Oberon was not directly involved, three enemy boats were sunk in the operation. The flotilla took part in the Royal Navy's engagement with one of the final sorties of the German High Seas Fleet during the First World War, on 24 April 1918, although the two fleets did not actually meet and the destroyer saw no action.

After the armistice, the Grand Fleet was disbanded and Oberon was placed in reserve with a reduced company at the Nore on 28 November 1919. The harsh conditions of wartime service, exacerbated by the fact that the hull was not galvanised and operations often required high speed in high seas, meant that the destroyer was worn out and ready for retirement. Oberon was decommissioned, and sold to Thos. W. Ward at Rainham, Kent, on 9 May 1921 to be broken up.

Pennant numbers

References

Citations

Bibliography

 
 
 
 

 
 
 
 
 
 

1916 ships
Admiralty M-class destroyers
Ships built on the River Wear
World War I destroyers of the United Kingdom